Industrial Union of Donbas (ISD) is one of the biggest corporations in Ukraine. It is a horizontally integrated holding company that owns or directs stocks of 40 industrial enterprises in the East Ukraine, Hungary, and Poland. The company was created in 1995 and before the appearance of SCM Holdings in 2000 was a major steel rolling corporation in the East Ukraine. According to Interfax, ISD produces 9.2 million of steel annually. In 2012 World Steel Association ranking the corporation placed 33rd sharing it with JSW Steel Ltd.

Stock holders
 Serhiy Taruta
 Oleh Mkrtchian
 Vitaliy Haiduk (left corporation)

In 2010 the Swiss-based Carbofer Group (associate of Evraz Group) along with a "group of investors" and the Vnesheconombank has purchased the controlling interest in corporation 50%+2 stocks.
 Because of that Vitaliy Haiduk left ISD. Earlier in 2007 Metalloinvest showed its interest to buy portion of ISD.

List of holding's main enterprises
 Alchevsk Metallurgical Combine
 Alchevsk Coke-chemical Plant
 Dnieper Metallurgical Combine (Kamianske)
 ISD Dunaferr (Dunaújváros, since 2004)

2007 acquisitions

In 2007 ISD obtained from SCM Holdings the Kuibyshev Kramatorsk Metallurgical Plant (Kramatorsk) which was fighting against bankruptcy charges since 2006. At the end of 2012 the Donetsk Economical Court recognized Kramatorsk Metallurgical Plant as bankrupt, while most of its assets were transferred to two smaller factories - Kramatorsk Metal-rolling Plant and Kramatorsk Ferroalloy Plant.

ISD obtained 75% shares of the Gdansk Shipyard, with the remaining share held by the Polish government. The Polish government regained 50% in 2018.

Smaller companies
 Dnieper Pipe Plant (Pavlohrad, built in 2008)
 Enerhomashspetsstal (Kramatorsk)
 Panteleimon Refractory Plant (Horlivka)
 Agrarian companies: "Olha", "Zoria"
 Dianivska Poultry Farm
 Bakhmut Agrarian Union
 Karansky Grain Elevator

Media companies
 Internet publisher "ProUA"
 Comments newspaper (comments.ua)
 Economic news newspaper (www.eizvestia.com)
 Expert-Ukraine magazine
 Invest-Gazette

Sports

 ISD sports club (www.sportclub-isd.com)
 FC Metalurh Donetsk (went bankrupt in 2015 and merged into Stal Kamianske)
 FC Stal Kamianske (moved to Bucha and became PFC Feniks Bucha before going bankrupt in 2018)
 HC Sokil Kyiv (sponsorship)

Former enterprises
 Khartsyzsk pipe plant
 Kramatorsk Metallurgical Plant
 ISD Huta Czestochowa (Częstochowa). (Since 22 January 2021 part of Liberty House Group.)

Relations and controversies
Academics state that ISD provided significant financial support for Viktor Yuschenko during his presidential campaign and subsequent Orange Revolution. Vitaliy Haiduk (appointed by President Yuschenko) headed the National Security and Defense Council of Ukraine from October 2006 till May 2007. Haiduk also served as deputy minister and minister of fuel and energy from 2000 under former President Leonid Kuchma, who in 2002 promoted him to deputy prime minister. Haiduk also served as an adviser on energy to former Prime Minister Yulia Tymoshenko prior to 2010.

See also
 Yevhen Shcherban#Assassination

References

External links
 Official website
 Åslund, A. How Ukraine Became a Market Economy and Democracy. "Peterson Institute". 2009.
 Wolchik, S.L., Curry, J.L. Central and East European Politics: From Communism to Democracy. "Rowman & Littlefield". 2008

 
Holding companies of Ukraine
Companies based in Donetsk
Economy of Donetsk Oblast
Economy of Dnipropetrovsk Oblast
Donbas
Conglomerate companies of Ukraine
Companies based in Donetsk Oblast